Blok is a surname of Dutch origin. Dutch blok has similar meanings as English "block" and the name has a variety of origins, including descriptive, metonymic occupational (referring e.g. to a miller or shoemaker), toponymic or even patronymic. The Russian and Polish surnames appear of German and Dutch descent. Notable people with the surname include:

 Alexander Blok (1880–1921), Russian lyrical poet
  (1852–1909), Russian law professor, father of Alexander Blok
 Anneke Blok (born 1959), Dutch actress
  (1868–1934), Dutch jurist and university president
 Anton Blok (born 1935), Dutch anthropologist
 Arthur Blok (1882–1974), English first administrative head of the Technion – Israel Institute of Technology
 Benjamin Block (1631–1690), German-Hungarian painter, son of Daniel
 Daniel Blok (1580–1660), German painter of Dutch ancestry
 Dick Blok (1925–2019), Dutch scholar of onomastics
 Ger Blok (1939–2016), Dutch football manager
 Hetty Blok (1920–2012), Dutch cabaret artist, singer, and actress
 Irina Blok (born c.1977), Russian-born American graphic designer and artist
 (1858–1906), Russian governor of Samara, uncle of Alexander Blok
 Johanna Blok (1650–1715), Dutch silhouette cutter, painter, drawer, etc.
 Josine Blok (born 1953), Dutch classical scholar
  (1881–1939), Russian artist and historian, wife of Alexander Blok, daughter of Dmitri Mendeleev
 Peter Blok (born 1960), Dutch stage, television, film and voice actor
 Petrus Johannes Blok (1855–1929), Dutch historian
 Stanisław Blok (1916–1994), Polish fighter ace in World War II
 Stef Blok (born 1964), Dutch politician (VVD)
 Tom de Blok (born 1996), Dutch baseball pitcher
 Vladimir Blok (1932–1996), Russian musicologist, composer and orchestrator
 Willem Johannes "Wim" Blok (1947–2003), Dutch logician
 Willy Blok Hanson (1914–2012), Javanese-born Canadian dancer and choreographer

See also
Block (disambiguation)#People with the surname

References

German-language surnames
Germanic-language surnames
Surnames of German origin